Nanopunk refers to an emerging subgenre of science fiction that is still very much in its infancy in comparison to its ancestor-genre, cyberpunk, and some of its other derivatives.

The genre is especially similar to biopunk, but describes a world where nanites and bio-nanotechnologies are widely in use and nanotechnologies are the predominant technological forces in society.

Currently the genre is mainly concerned with the artistic, psychological, and societal impact of nanotechnology, rather than aspects of the technology which itself is still in its infancy. Unlike cyberpunk, which can be distinguished by a gritty and low-life yet technologically advanced character, nanopunk can have a darker dystopian character that might examine potential risks by nanotechnology as well as a more optimistic outlook that might emphasize potential uses of nanotechnology.

Comics 
M. Rex (1999) features nanites as the source of power for the title character.
Scooby Apocalypse (2016–2019) reveals early on that a nanite virus originating from Velma's 'Elysium Project' experiment is the reason behind people becoming monsters.

Literature 
Kathleen Ann Goonan (Queen City Jazz – 1997) and Linda Nagata were some of the earliest writers to feature nanotech as the primary element in their work.
Another example of this genre is Neal Stephenson's The Diamond Age. Some novels of Stanislaw Lem, including Weapon System of the Twenty First Century or The Upside-down Evolution, The Invincible and Peace on Earth as well as Greg Bear's Blood Music could also be considered precursors of nanopunk.
Another example is the Michael Crichton novel Prey (2002). Another of Crichton's novels, Micro (2011), could also be an example, but it focuses more on the idea of size-manipulation/shrinking of objects rather than nanotechnology. More recently, Nathan McGrath's Nanopunk (2013) is set in an icebound near-future where almost half the world's population has been wiped out. Alister, a child when "The Big Freeze" began is now a teenager in a society slowly finding its feet. Unaware of his nano-infection he sets out to find his lost sister and is joined by Suzie, a militant cyber-activist. Their hacking attracts the attention of Secret Services and a ruthless private military corporation and their search becomes a deadly race for survival.
Linda Nagata's Tech Heaven (1995) is a futuristic thriller about Katie, a woman whose husband is about to die of injuries sustained in a helicopter crash. Instead of dying, he gets his body cryogenically preserved so that he can be reawakened when med-tech is advanced enough to heal him. The problem is that it winds up taking far more than the estimated few years for this to happen.
Alastair Reynolds' Chasm City could also be considered nanopunk.

Film and television

Film
 Honey, I Shrunk the Kids (1989 film)
Osmosis Jones (2001 film)
The Day the Earth Stood Still (2008 film)
G.I. Joe: The Rise of Cobra (2009 film)
 Transcendence (2014 film)
Ant-Man (2015 film)

Television

 The Magic School Bus (1994–1997)
 The Simpsons, "Treehouse of Horror VII", "The Genesis Tub" (1996)
 Futurama, "Parasites Lost" (2001)
 Justice League, "Tabula Rasa" (2003)
 Static Shock, "Hoop Squad" (2004)
 Doctor Who, "The Doctor Dances" (2005)
 Generator Rex (2010–2013)
 Big Hero 6: The Series (2017–2021)
 Altered Carbon (2018–2020)

Video games 
 Anarchy Online (2001)
 Crysis (2007–2013)
 Deus Ex (2000)
 Metal Gear Solid series
 Supreme Ruler 2020 (2008)
 Red Faction (2001)

See also 
 Biopunk
 Cyberpunk derivatives
 Kathleen Ann Goonan
 Nanotechnology in fiction
 Posthuman
 Postcyberpunk
 Societal impact of nanotechnology

References

  
Cyberpunk subgenres
Postcyberpunk
Biopunk

Transhumanism
2000s neologisms